Orthogonius lieftincki is a species of ground beetle in the subfamily Orthogoniinae. It was described by Andrewes in 1936.

References

lieftincki
Beetles described in 1936